Nisha Noor (1962–2007) was an Indian actress. She was mainly active in Tamil and Malayalam films. She also acted in few Telugu and Kannada as well.

Career

Nisha Noor was popular for her roles in the films like Kalyana Agathigal (1986) and Iyer the Great (1990). She acted in several other films like Tik Tik Tik (1981), the critically acclaimed Chuvappu Naada, Mimics Action 500, Inimai Idho Idho etc. She was at the peak of her career during 1980 to 1986 and worked with directors such as K. Balachander, Visu and Chandrashekar.

Noor died in 2007 from AIDS-related complications.

Partial filmography

Tamil
 Mangala Nayagi (1980)
 Muyalakku Moonu Kaal (1980)
 Ilamai Kolam (1980)
 Enakkaga Kaathiru (1981)
 Tik Tik Tik (1981)
 Manamadurai Malli (1982
 Inimai Idho Idho (1983)
 Aval Sumangalithan (1985)...Stella
 Sri Raghavendrar (1985)
 Kalyana Agathigal (1986)
 Aval Oru Vasantham (1992)

Malayalam
 Chuvappu Naada (1990)
 Mimics Parade (1990)
 Iyer the Great (1990)
 Devasuram  (1993)
 Mimics Action 500 (1995)

References

Actresses from Chennai
1962 births
2007 deaths
Actresses in Tamil cinema
Actresses in Malayalam cinema
Indian film actresses
20th-century Indian actresses
AIDS-related deaths in India